Sentimientos (Feelings) is the title of a studio album released by Colombian performer Charlie Zaa. This album became his first number-one set on the Billboard Top Latin Albums. The album given a Premio Lo Nuestro award for "Tropical Album of the Year".

Track listing
The following information is from Billboard.

Personnel
Milton Salcedo – arranger
Hugo Gutiérrez – director
Rafael Henriquez – engineer, mixing
Liliana Parra – violin
Jorge Ramirez – bass, piano, mixing
Sady Ramírez – percussion, programming, mixing
Luis Maria Diaz – viola
Valentin Diaz – violin
Gabriel Randón – guitar
Hans Rincón – violoncello
Carlos Sanchez – vocals
Marcos Silva – assistant
Ernesto Simpson – synthesizer, drums
Germán Villareal – banjo, conga
Jorge Gamboa – photography
Rubén Datio Dagura – design

Chart performance

Certifications and sales

See also
List of number-one Billboard Top Latin Albums from the 1990s
List of number-one Billboard Tropical Albums from the 1990s
 List of best-selling Latin albums

References

1996 debut albums
Charlie Zaa albums
Spanish-language albums
Covers albums